Letters from 74 Rue Taitbout or Don't Go But If You Must Say Hello To Everybody is a book of short stories in the form of letters by William Saroyan.  The stories often recollect meetings, relationships, observations, ask questions and wonder what happened to some of the people from Saroyan's past.

Contents of the book
"To The Only One"
"Armenak of Bitlis"
"Dr. Freud, Dr. Jung, and Dr. Adler"
"Hovagim Saroyan"
"Calouste Gulbenkian"
"Guy de Maupassant"
"The Match Girl"
"Prof-Kalfayan"
"Sammy Isaacs"
"Al Devarine"
"Samuel L. Clemens"
"Dikran Saroyan"
"Joe Gould"
"Miss Carmichael, Miss Thompson, Miss Brockington, Miss Clifford, Miss Chambers"
"Honoré de Balzac"
"Sam Catanzaro"
"Vahan Minasian"
"Geoffrey Faber"
"Robert McAlmon"
"Lawrence Colt"
"Yeghishe Charentz"
"Adolf Hitler"
"Carl Sandburg"
"Emory L. Ralston"
"Dr. Harold Fraser"
"Benito Mussolini"
"The Lion of Judah"
"Jacob Ahbood"
"Dr. Anoushavan Chomp"
"L. B. Mayer"
"Anybody"

References

 Letters from 74 Rue Taitbout or Don't Go But If You Must Say Hello To Everybody, by William Saroyan

1971 books
Works by William Saroyan
Novels set in California
Novels set during World War II
San Joaquin Valley
Cultural depictions of Sigmund Freud
Cultural depictions of Carl Jung
Cultural depictions of Adolf Hitler
Cultural depictions of Benito Mussolini
Cultural depictions of Haile Selassie
Cultural depictions of Honoré de Balzac
Cultural depictions of Mark Twain